Psalm 127 is the 127th psalm of the Book of Psalms, beginning in English in the King James Version: "Except the Lord build the house". In Latin, it is known by the incipit of its first 2 words, . It is one of 15 "Songs of Ascents" and the only one among them attributed to Solomon rather than David.

In the slightly different numbering system used in the Greek Septuagint and the Latin Vulgate, this psalm is Psalm 126.

The text is divided into five verses. The first two express the notion that "without God, all is in vain", popularly summarized in Latin in the motto . The remaining three verses describe progeny as God's blessing. 

The psalm forms a regular part of Jewish, Catholic, Lutheran, Anglican and other Protestant liturgies. The Vulgate text  was set to music numerous times during the Renaissance and Baroque periods, often as part of vespers, including Claudio Monteverdi's ten-part setting as part of his 1610 , Marc-Antoine Charpentier, (3 sets), H 150, H 160, H 231, Handel's  (1707) and two settings by Antonio Vivaldi. Composers such as  Adam Gumpelzhaimer and Heinrich Schütz set the German .

Text

Hebrew Bible version
Following is the Hebrew text of Psalm 127:

King James Version
 Except the  build the house, they labour in vain that build it: except the  keep the city, the watchman waketh but in vain. 
 It is vain for you to rise up early, to sit up late, to eat the bread of sorrows: for so he giveth his beloved sleep. 
 Lo, children are an heritage of the : and the fruit of the womb is his reward. 
 As arrows are in the hand of a mighty man; so are children of the youth. 
 Happy is the man that hath his quiver full of them: they shall not be ashamed, but they shall speak with the enemies in the gate.

Authorship 
According to Jewish tradition, Psalm 127 was written by David and dedicated to his son Solomon, who would build the First Temple. According to Radak, verses 3–5, which reference "sons", express David's feelings about his son Solomon; according to Rashi, these verses refer to the students of a Torah scholar, who are called his "sons".

The psalm's superscription calls it "of Solomon", but Christian theologian Albert Barnes noted that "in the Syriac Version, the title is, "From the Psalms of the Ascent; spoken by David concerning Solomon; it was spoken also of Haggai and Zechariah, who urged the rebuilding of the Temple". The Authorized Version describes the psalm as "a Song of degrees for Solomon", and Wycliffe's translators recognised both options. Isaac Gottlieb of Bar Ilan University suggests that the reference in verse 2 to "his beloved" "recalls Solomon's other name, Yedidiah".

Themes
Charles Spurgeon calls Psalm 127 "The Builder's Psalm", noting the similarity between the Hebrew words for sons and builders. He writes:We are here taught that builders of houses and cities, systems and fortunes, empires and churches all labour in vain without the Lord; but under the divine favour they enjoy perfect rest. Sons, who are in the Hebrew called "builders", are set forth as building up families under the same divine blessing, to the great honour and happiness of their parents.

Spurgeon also quotes the English preacher Henry Smith (1560–1591): "Well doth David call children 'arrows' [v. 4]; for if they be well bred, they shoot at their parents' enemies; and if they be evil bred, they shoot at their parents".

The Midrash Tehillim interprets the opening verses of the psalm as referring to teachers and students of Torah. On the watchmen of the city mentioned in verse 1, Rabbi Hiyya, Rabbi Yosi, and Rabbi Ammi said, "The [true] watchmen of the city are the teachers of Scripture and instructors of Oral Law". On "the Lord gives" in verse 2, the Midrash explains that God "gives" life in the world to come to the wives of Torah scholars because they deprive themselves of sleep to support their husbands.

Translation 

The translation of the psalm offers difficulties, especially in verses 2 and 4.
 (KJV "children of the youth", translated in LXX as  "children of the outcast").

There are two possible interpretations of the phrase  (KJV: "for so he giveth his beloved sleep"): The word "sleep" may either be the direct object (as in KJV, following LXX and Vulgate), or an accusative used adverbially, "in sleep", i.e. "while they are asleep". Keil and Delitzsch (1883) accept the reading of the accusative as adverbial, paraphrasing "God gives to His beloved in sleep, i.e., without restless self-activity, in a state of self-forgetful renunciation, and modest, calm surrender to Him".

However, Alexander Kirkpatrick in the Cambridge Bible for Schools and Colleges (1906) argues that while the reading "So he giveth unto his beloved in sleep" fits the context, the natural translation of the Hebrew text is still the one given by the ancient translators, suggesting that the Hebrew text as transmitted has been corrupted (which would make the LXX and Vulgate readings not so much "mistranslations" as correct translations of an already corrupted reading).

English translations have been reluctant to emend the translation, due to the long-standing association of this verse with sleep being the gift of God. Abraham Cronbach (1933) refers to this as "one of those glorious mistranslations, a mistranslation which enabled Mrs. Browning to write one of the tenderest poems in the English language", referring to Elizabeth Barrett Browning's poem The Sleep, which uses "He giveth his beloved Sleep" as the last line of each stanza.

Keil and Delitzsch (1883) take , "to sit up", as confirmation for the assumption, also suggested by 1 Samuel 20:24, that the custom of the Hebrews before the Hellenistic period was to take their meals sitting up, and not reclining as was the Greco-Roman custom.

Uses

Judaism 
In Judaism, Psalm 127 is recited as part of the series of psalms read after the Shabbat afternoon service between Sukkot and Shabbat HaGadol.

It is also recited as a prayer for protection of a newborn infant.

Catholic Church
Since the early Middle ages, this psalm was traditionally recited or sung at the Office of None during the week, specifically from Tuesday until Saturday between Psalm 126 and Psalm 128, following the Rule of St. Benedict. During the Liturgy of the Hours, Psalm 126 is recited at vespers on the third Wednesday of the four weekly liturgical cycle.

Protestantism 
The pro-natalist Quiverfull movement invokes the less quoted latter part of the psalm, verses 3–5 concerning the blessings and advantages of numerous offspring, as one of the foundations for their stance and takes its name from the last verse ("Happy is the man that hath his  of them [i.e. sons]").

Musical settings 
The Vulgate text of the psalm, has been set to music many times, often as part of vespers services. Settings from the classical period use the text of the Sixto-Clementine Vulgate of 1592, which groups  ("as he gives sleep to those in whom he delights") with verse 3 rather than verse 2 (as opposed to Jerome's text, and most modern translations, grouping the phrase with verse 2). Notable compositions include:

  is a German metrical and rhyming paraphrase of the psalm by Johann Kolross, set to music by Luther (printed 1597) and by Hans Leo Hassler. Adam Gumpelzhaimer used the first two lines for a canon,  ("Where God to the house does not give his blessing / There toils every man in vain").
 Orlando di Lasso, a capella motet for five voices, (published in 1562).
 Giovanni Matteo Asola, a capella setting published in 1599.
 Alessandro Grandi, motet with trombones and basso continuo, published in 1630
 Francesco Cavalli, setting for four parts and strings, published in Musiche Sacre Concernenti, Venice, (1656).
 Giovanni Giacomo Arrigoni, motet , published in 1663
 Marc-Antoine Charpentier :
, grand motet for soloists, chorus, 2 treble instruments and continuo H.150 (? early 1670).
, grand motet for soloists, chorus and continuo H.160 - 160 a (? early 1670).
, motet for 3 voices, 2 treble instruments and continuo H.231 (date unknown).
Biber, cantata for 2 voices, violin and b.c. (after 1676).
Handel's , believed to have been written for a vespers service in 1707
Henry Desmarest, grand motet  (17..).
Jan Dismas Zelenka, motet  ZWV 92, c. 1726.
Michel-Richard Delalande, grand motet  S42 (1729).
Jean-Joseph Cassanéa de Mondonville, grand motet  (1743).
 Antonio Vivaldi, two settings, RV 608 for strings and solo voice and RV 803 for strings and choir, discovered among the "Galuppi" sacred works in the Saxon State and University Library Dresden in 2006.
Florence Margaret Spencer Palmer (1900-1987) motet "Except the Lord Build the House"

("Without God, [it is] in vain") is a popular motto derived from the psalm's first verse, as an abbreviation of "Except the Lord build the house, they labour in vain that build it". It is often inscribed on buildings. It has been the motto in the coat of arms of the City of Edinburgh since 1647, and was the motto of the former Metropolitan Borough of Chelsea. It was similarly the motto of the King's Own Scottish Borderers.

It has been adopted as the motto for numerous schools in Great Britain, including King Edward VI High School, Stafford, Melbourn Village College, London, and as the insignia of Glenlola Collegiate School in Northern Ireland. Other schools with this motto are St Joseph's College, Dumfries, Villa Maria Academy (Malvern, Pennsylvania), Rickmansworth School (Nisi Dominus Aedificaverit), The Park School, Yeovil, Bukit Bintang Girls' School, Bukit Bintang Boys' Secondary School, St Thomas School, Kolkata, Kirkbie Kendal School, Richmond College, Galle, Mount Temple Comprehensive School, Dublin, Ireland, and Launceston Church Grammar School, Tasmania, Australia.

The Aquitanian city of Agen takes as its motto the second verse of the psalm, : "Unless the Lord watches over the city, the guards stand watch in vain" (verse 1a, NIV version).

References

Sources

External links 

 
 
 Text of Psalm 127 according to the 1928 Psalter
 Psalms Chapter 127 text in Hebrew and English, mechon-mamre.org
 Unless the LORD build the house, they labor in vain who build. text and footnotes, usccb.org United States Conference of Catholic Bishops
 Psalm 127:1 introduction and text, biblestudytools.com
 Psalm 127 – God’s Work in Building Houses, Cities, and Families enduringword.com
 Psalm 127 / Refrain: The Lord shall keep watch over your going out and your coming in. Church of England
 Psalm 127 at biblegateway.com

127
Solomon